Manjot Kalra (born 15 January 1999) is an Indian cricketer who played for India U-19 team. He scored a match-winning hundred, and was man-of-the-match in the final of 2018 Under-19 Cricket World Cup. In the 2018 Indian Premier League auction, he was bought by the Delhi Daredevils, though he did not play any games for them during that season.

Career 
He made his Twenty20 debut for Delhi in the 2018–19 Syed Mushtaq Ali Trophy on 10 March 2019.

In June 2019, a special Investigations unit of the Delhi Police filed charges against Kalra's parents, alleging that they had falsely claimed that he had been born in 1999 to allow him to compete in junior cricket when he was over the age limit. He was released by the Delhi Capitals ahead of the 2020 IPL auction. In January 2020, he was given a one-year suspension from playing in the Ranji Trophy due to age fraud.

He made his List A debut on 7 March 2021, for Delhi in the 2020–21 Vijay Hazare Trophy.

References

1998 births
Living people
Indian cricketers
Delhi cricketers